The Police and Justice Act 2006 (PJA) is an act of the Parliament of the United Kingdom. It received royal assent on 8 November 2006. The PJA created the National Policing Improvement Agency. It changed how members of police authorities may be appointed and altered their duties. It increased police officers' powers to impose bail conditions when releasing a suspect. Along with the Serious Crime Act 2007, the PJA also updated the Computer Misuse Act 1990, which was regarded as outdated when the two statutes were passed. Pursuant to the PJA, the scope of the Computer Misuse Act was extended to deal with denial-of-service attacks.

See also
Police Act

Notes

Sources

External links
The Police and Justice Act 2006, as amended from the National Archives.
The Police and Justice Act 2006, as originally enacted from the National Archives.
Explanatory notes to the Police and Justice Act 2006.

United Kingdom Acts of Parliament 2006
Computing legislation
Anti-social behaviour
Police legislation in the United Kingdom